Tri Synergy is a video game publisher founded in 1996 in Dallas, Texas. They specialize in co-publishing games made by a variety of developers.

Games

References

External links
Official website (archived)
Tri Synergy, Inc. at MobyGames

1996 establishments in Texas
American companies established in 1996
Companies based in Dallas
Video game companies established in 1996
Video game companies of the United States
Video game publishers